Mary Goretti Kitutu, also Mary Goretti Kitutu Kimono is a Ugandan academic, politician and environmentalist. She was appointed Minister for Karamoja Affairs on 8 June 2021, replacing John Byabagambi. She was the Minister of Energy and Mineral Development, in the Ugandan Cabinet, from 14 December 2019 to 8 June 2021. Before that, from 10 June 2016, until 14 December 2019, she served as the State Minister for the Environment in the Cabinet of Uganda. Dr Mary Kitutu concurrently serves as the elected  Manafwa District Women's Representative, in the 10th Parliament (2016 - 2021).

Background and education
She was born in Manafwa District on 17 September 1962. After attending local schools, she entered Makerere University in 1984, graduating in 1987 with a Bachelor of Science degree in Chemistry and Geology. In 1993, she went back to Makerere and obtained a Postgraduate Diploma in Education. Her Master of Science degree was obtained in 1998 from the Faculty of Geo-Information Science and Earth Observation of the University of Twente, in Enschede, Netherlands. In 2011, she obtained a Doctor of Philosophy from Makerere University, in Kampala, Uganda.

Career
Her first job out of university was as a teacher at Busoga College Mwiri, from 1988 until 1991. From 1991 until 1996, she taught at Our Lady of Good Counsel School, in Gayaza, Wakiso District. After she left teaching, she worked as a consultant at Axis Technical Geo Mineral Consult, between 1998 and 2001.

In April 2002, she was hired as a Research Officer and Environmental Specialist at the National Environment Management Authority (NEMA), serving in that capacity until February 2015. From February 2015, she worked as a Senior Technical Advisor and Environmental Monitor at Tetra Tech, a project sponsored by USAID, serving in that capacity until 2015.

Politics
In late 2015, she entered Ugandan elective politics by contesting for the Manafwa District Women Representative in the 2016 national and parliamentary elections. She ran on the National Resistance Movement political party platform. She won and is the incumbent. She was appointed State Minister for the Environment on 6 June 2016. In a cabinet reshuffle on 14 December 2019, Mary Goretti Kitutu, was named Cabinet Minister for Energy and Mineral Development. She replaced Irene Muloni, who was dropped from Cabinet.

See also
 Cabinet of Uganda
 Parliament of Uganda

References

Living people
1962 births
Members of the Parliament of Uganda
Government ministers of Uganda
People from Manafwa District
People from Eastern Region, Uganda
Makerere University alumni
University of Twente alumni
Women government ministers of Uganda
Women members of the Parliament of Uganda
National Resistance Movement politicians
21st-century Ugandan politicians
21st-century Ugandan women politicians
21st-century Ugandan women scientists
21st-century Ugandan scientists